Events from the year 1659 in Ireland.

Incumbent
Lord Protector: Richard Cromwell (until 25 May)

Events
 May 25 – Richard Cromwell (son of Oliver) resigns as Lord Protector of England, Scotland and Ireland.
 June 15 – Henry Cromwell (son of Oliver) resigns as Lord Lieutenant of Ireland.

Births
September – Claud Hamilton, 4th Earl of Abercorn, Jacobite and soldier, fought at the Battle of the Boyne (d.1691)
October 28 – Nicholas Brady, Anglican divine and poet (d.1726)

Deaths

References

 
1650s in Ireland
Ireland
Years of the 17th century in Ireland